Page Center is an unincorporated community in Harlan Township, Page County, Iowa, United States.

History
Page's population was estimated at 25 in 1887, was 53 in 1902, and was 32 in 1925.

References

Unincorporated communities in Page County, Iowa
Unincorporated communities in Iowa